WS2C is a putative gene associated with Waardenburg syndrome type 2. It has not yet been isolated from its locus of chromosome 8p23 since it was first reported in 2001.

History 
This locus was first linked to Waardenburg syndrome in 2001, when a study of an Italian family with Waardenburg syndrome type 2 features found that they were due to an unknown gene on chromosome 8 at locus 8q23 which had been broken by a chromosomal translocation. The study established a provisional name for the gene, WS2C. However, mutations in this region in Waardenburg syndrome patients have not been found since.

References